Michael Reginald Thomas (born 7 July 1954) is a Welsh former footballer who played as a winger. At club level, he played for Wrexham, Manchester United, Everton, Brighton & Hove Albion, Stoke City, Chelsea, West Bromwich Albion, Derby County, Shrewsbury Town and Leeds United. As a Welsh international, he made 51 appearances and scored four goals.

Thomas began his career with local side Wrexham where he spent eight seasons and earned a move to Manchester United in 1978. After three seasons at Old Trafford, Thomas had short spells at Everton and Brighton & Hove Albion before joining Stoke City in August 1982. After one and a half seasons at the Victoria Ground, he moved on to Chelsea, with whom he helped gain promotion in 1983–84. He then played for West Bromwich Albion and Derby County and also spent two years in the United States playing indoor football for Wichita Wings. He moved back to England in 1988 to play for Shrewsbury Town and Leeds United before making returns to Stoke City and Wrexham.

Playing career
Thomas was born in Mochdre, Conwy, Wales, and was among a group of notable footballers to come out of North West Wales during the 1970s and 1980s. Local factory Quinton Hazell bought him a pair of boots when he was at school in the mid-1960s, and at the age of 13 Thomas was a success as left wing on the factory's Conwy League men's team. By 15, he and friend Joey Jones were taken on by Wrexham. Though the first two years were spent cleaning boots, the changing rooms and the whole stadium, Thomas made his first-team debut in the 1971–72 season, when still only 17. Under manager John Neal he helped Wrexham establish their giant-killing reputation by reaching the quarter finals of the FA Cup in 1974 and the quarter finals of the European Cup Winners' Cup in 1976, when they lost to the eventual winners, Anderlecht of Belgium. After helping Wrexham storm to the Third Division title in 1977–78, Thomas crossed the border to England and joined Manchester United. He played 110 games and scored 15 goals for the Red Devils, collecting an FA Cup runners-up medal in 1979.

He then moved to Everton in August 1981 but lasted just three months at Everton, his contract terminated by manager Howard Kendall in the autumn of 1981 after he refused to play in the reserves. He moved to Brighton & Hove Albion where he saw out the 1981–82 season but his wife struggled to settle in Brighton and so he moved on again this time to Stoke City for a fee of £200,000. He instantly became a favourite at the Victoria Ground and top-scored in 1982–83 with 12 goals coming from left wing and he won the player of the year award. In the summer of 1983 manager Richie Barker decided to alter his style of play to the long ball game. This decision did not go down well with the players and most of them signalled their intent to leave and Thomas left in January 1984, after scoring three goals in 21 matches in 1983–84.

He joined promotion-chasing Chelsea in January 1984, signed by the manager who had given him his debut at Wrexham, John Neal. Thomas made an immediate impact, scoring twice on his debut and helping the club become Second Division champions in 1983–84. He was sold to West Bromwich Albion in 1985 for £100,000 where he played 28 times scoring once and also had a short loan spell at Derby County. In 1986 Thomas moved to the United States where he lent his skills to the Wichita Wings in the Major Indoor Soccer League. After two seasons in the United States he returned to England with Shrewsbury Town and Leeds United before making a return to Stoke City in March 1990. He could do little to prevent Alan Ball's Stoke suffering relegation in 1989–90 but at the age of 36 he played in 44 matches in 1990–91 and won the player of the year award again as Stoke failed to mount a promotion challenge. He was released at the end of the season by Lou Macari and returned to Wrexham in 1991, where in the memorable FA Cup defeat of Arsenal in January 1992, 37-year-old Thomas scored the equalising goal from a free kick.

He joined Welsh League side Porthmadog in 1994 under the management of former Wales international teammate Ian Edwards. When Edwards was sacked Thomas took over as a player-manager however in his three months in charge the side only picked up one point and Thomas decided to leave.

International career
Thomas gained 51 caps for Wales, and counts scoring a goal for Wales in their win over England as one of the most memorable moments of his career.

Personal life
During his football career, Thomas became involved in a counterfeit currency scam, whereby he laundered the money through Wrexham's trainees. North Wales Police arrested him in 1993, and after a trial he was sentenced to 18 months in jail.

In August 1992, Thomas was attacked by two men in a country lane at Dyserth, Clwyd. He was sitting in his Volkswagen with a 29-year-old woman, when his window was smashed and he was assaulted with a hammer and a screwdriver. Thomas was admitted to hospital with 15 stab wounds to his left buttock.

In February 2019, Thomas made public that he had stomach cancer.

After football
Thomas never played at senior level after his imprisonment, although he did continue playing for a while at non-league level with Porthmadog and Amlwch Town in Wales, until he finally retired from playing in 1995 at the age of 41. Thomas currently provides analysis on all Manchester United matches on "Total Football" on Key 103 and Piccadilly Magic 1152. He also works as an after-dinner speaker.

Career statistics

Club
Source:

A.  The "Other" column constitutes appearances and goals in the Full Members Cup, Football League Trophy, UEFA Cup, UEFA Cup Winners' Cup.

International
Source:

Honours
Wrexham
 Welsh Cup winners: 1974–75, 1977–78
 Football League Third Division champions: 1977–78
 Football League Fourth Division promotion: 1992–93

Manchester United
 FA Cup runner-up: 1979

Chelsea
 Football League Second Division champions: 1983–84

Individual
 Stoke City Player of the Year: 1983, 1991

References

External links
Mickey's Stats @ Leeds-fans.org.uk

1954 births
Living people
People from Colwyn Bay
Sportspeople from Conwy County Borough
Brighton & Hove Albion F.C. players
Chelsea F.C. players
Derby County F.C. players
Everton F.C. players
Leeds United F.C. players
Manchester United F.C. players
Shrewsbury Town F.C. players
Stoke City F.C. players
Wales international footballers
Wales under-23 international footballers
Welsh footballers
West Bromwich Albion F.C. players
Wrexham A.F.C. players
English Football League players
Prisoners and detainees of England and Wales
Welsh prisoners and detainees
Association football wingers
British counterfeiters
People convicted of money laundering
FA Cup Final players
Sportspeople convicted of crimes
Porthmadog F.C. players